Baise railway station is a railway station located in Youjiang District, Baise, Guangxi, China.

History
The station was rebuilt in 2015. High-speed services began serving Baise on 11 December 2015 with the opening of the first phase of the Nanning–Kunming high-speed railway between Baise and Nanning.

References 

Railway stations in Guangxi
Stations on the Nanning–Kunming high-speed railway